Carol Davis may refer to:

 Carol Davis (American football) (born 1930/1931), owner of the Las Vegas Raiders
 Carol Anne Davis (born 1961), Scottish crime novelist and writer on crime
 Carol Rymer Davis (1944–2010), American balloonist and radiologist

See also
 Carole Davis (born 1958), English-American actress, model, singer/songwriter and writer
 Carl Davis (disambiguation)